Veepanagandla is a mandal and village in Wanaparthy district, Telangana.

Villages
The 2016 Telangana districts reorganization removed 16 villages from Veepanagandla mandal and added 6 villages from Pangal mandal to Veepanagandla mandal. Below are the 11 villages in Veepanagandla mandal after the reorganization:
 Bollaram 	
 Gopaldinne 	
 Govardhanagiri	
 Kalvarala
 Korlakunta
 Pulgarcherla	
 Sampatraopalle
 Sanginepalle
 Toomkunta
 Vallabhapur
 Veepanagandla
 Rangawaram
 Vallabhapur tanda
 Nagarlabanda tanda

References

Mandals in Wanaparthy district